French Mills, or French's Mills, was the site of a sawmill, which started making clothes in 1795 under its owner Peter K. Broek. It was sold to Abel French in 1800 and became a tavern that same year under Jacob Aker. It is located in Guilderland Center, New York.

It is unrelated to the French Mills that United States military forces retired to after the Battle of Crysler's Farm during the War of 1812.

External links
Guilderland official website

Former towns in New York (state)
Populated places in Albany County, New York